Oleg Kalidov (born 15 October 1951 in Borisoglebsk) is a Soviet sprint canoeist who competed in the early 1970s. He won a gold medal in the C-2 500 m event at the 1973 ICF Canoe Sprint World Championships in Tampere.

References
Oleg Kalidov at Ruchampions.com 
Oleg Kalidov at Canoeresults.eu

Living people
1951 births
People from Borisoglebsk
Soviet male canoeists
ICF Canoe Sprint World Championships medalists in Canadian